Maysky is a rural locality (a settlement) and the administrative center of Maysky Selsoviet, Romanovsky District, Altai Krai, Russia. The population was 446 as of 2013. There are 5 streets.

Geography 
Maysky is located 21 km north of Romanovo (the district's administrative centre) by road. Pamyat Kommunarov is the nearest rural locality.

References 

Rural localities in Romanovsky District, Altai Krai